Huang Hong may refer to:

 Huang Hong (handballer) (born 1980), Chinese team handball player
 Huang Hong (actor), Chinese skit and sitcom actor and writer

See also
 Hung Huang, Chinese fashion figure